Abdullah Al-Garni (Arabic: عبد الله القرني; born 18 February 1987) is a Saudi Arabian footballer. He currently plays as a defender for Al-Nassr in the Saudi Professional League.

Early club career
Al-Garni joined his birthplace football club Al-Zaytoon FC in Sabt Alalaya town. He first played as a defensive midfielder. At this time his team was competing the Saudi Arabian 3rd division league. After a while he decided to leave his hometown to complete his education in Aramco Institute. He was playing football non-professionally with colleagues in Aramco football team.

Abha 2008/2009
After Abha's promotion to the Saudi Professional League, Al-Garni went back to get closer to his hometown and signed a one-year contract with Abha. That is when he first played as a central defender under a supervision of the technical manager Mahdi Al-Ragdi. He made his debut with Abha against Al-Ittihad in the sixth round of the Saudi Professional League 2008–09. Since then, Al-Garni continued in Abha's line-up squad until ending the season with relegation to the Saudi First Division League.

Al-Nassr 2009/2010
As the previous technical manager, Edgardo Bauza, was looking for young defenders. He scouted Al-Garni and requested the youngster's service from Abha. Al-Nassr management signed, after a dramatic transfer, a five-year contract with Al-Garni, together with his teammate in Abha Khaled Al-Zylaeei, starting from 15 July 2009 

Al-Garni participated in a preparatory training camp in Barcelona, Spain with the new Uruguayan manager, Jorge da Silva. However, Al-Garni was deemed not yet mature enough to assume the reserve position for his team. He played a couple of matches with Al-Nassr U-23 team, which is considered to be team B in some countries, where he scored the first goal with Al-Nassr against Al-Shabab. In the ninth round of the Saudi Professional League, Al-Nassr played the worst 45 minutes against Al-Ahli from Jeddah when they received three goals ending the first half 3-0 for Al-Ahli. Al-Garni joined as a substitute at the beginning of the second half and the Al-Nassr succeed to get to end up the tough match with a big draw 3-3. Since then, he kept his position in the team until the end of the season.

International career
Al-Garni called up for the Saudi Arabia National Team for the first time at the end of the season 2009/2010  He suffered a knee injury during the training camp which was in Austria. He could not make his debut for the national team yet.

References

Living people
Saudi Arabian footballers
1987 births
Al-Zaytoon Club players
Abha Club players
Al Nassr FC players
Al-Qadsiah FC players
Al-Fateh SC players
Khaleej FC players
Saudi Fourth Division players
Saudi First Division League players
Saudi Professional League players
Association football defenders